Middlebury College Rugby Club is the Division II rugby union team of Middlebury College, located in Middlebury, Vermont.  Also known as The MCRC, the club competes in the New England Rugby Football Union.

Officers 
 Coaches : Kerry Wiebe, Avisa (Junior) Tuiqere, Ben Wells
 Co-Captain : William Abraham Ebby '2022
 Co-Captain : Samuel Madden '2022
 President : James Blayze '2022
 Treasurer : Benjamin Lesch '2024
 Match Secretary : Thomas Lee Summers '2024.5

D II National Champions 
On May 5, 2007, MCRC beat Arkansas State 38–22 to win the Division II National Championship for the first time in club history.  MCRC won the National Championship again in 2009, beating University of Wisconsin 27-11 and finishing the season undefeated.

Players

Titles 

East Coast Rugby Conference Division 1-AA Champions: 2012, 2013

National Division II Champions: 2007,2009

NERFU Division II Champions: 2001,2002,2003,2005,2006,2007,2008

Northeast Territorial Division II Champions: 2001,2002,2008

"The Blue" 

"The Blue" originated in the spring of 2008 under coaches Kevin O'Brien and John Phillips.  It is a recognition of players that played a minimum of 5 regular season or playoff games for the MCRC A-side.  Members of The Blue are responsible for nominating the team's captains for the following season and receive their jersey upon graduation.

References

External links
 

Middlebury Panthers rugby
American rugby union teams
Sports teams in Vermont